The discography of Australian rock group Gyroscope consists of four studio albums, thirteen singles, and five EPs.

Albums

Studio albums 

Notes
 ^ A. Around the World in 16 Songs is a split album with four tracks, "S4", "Half Your Problem", "So Wrong" and "Mediocre" by Gyroscope. Additional 12 tracks consist of four tracks each by NSF, Wackykids and Turtlehead.

Compilation albums

Extended plays 

Notes
 ^ B. Driving for the Storm EP peaked at No. 11 on the ARIA Heatseekers Albums Chart.

Singles 

Notes
 ^ C. "Dream vs. Scream" was released as a radio single and as a digital download in June 2006
 ^ D. "Live Without You" was uploaded to their MySpace page in December 2009 as a preview for Cohesion. However, "Some of the Places I Know" was the first official single from the album

Other appearances 

"Sexxxy (Acoustic)" – Triple J Live
"Monument" – Triple J Like a Version Vol. 2 – Jebediah Cover
"Cannonball" – No Man's Woman – The Breeders Cover
"Heaven & Hell" – "Easyfever" Easybeats Tribute Album

References

External links 

 
 

Discographies of Australian artists
Rock music group discographies